The Kickamuit River (often called the Kickemuit River) is a river in the states of Massachusetts and Rhode Island flowing approximately .

History
The name Kickamuit is a Narragansett word that has numerous spellings. The river was a major traffic artery during the American Revolutionary War, and supplies traveled upriver daily. By the 1800s, oyster beds were a major revenue source, but effluent from the nearby Parker Mills and general sewage pollution killed most of the oysters by 1910. The Kickamuit River oyster industry was ended with the 1938 New England hurricane.

The Kickamuit River is classified as a Class A, Type II Waterway and open to both recreational activities and shell-fishing.

Course
The river's source is in Rehoboth, Massachusetts in the swamps north of Locust Street in Swansea. The reservoir's dam forms the boundary between fresh and salt water. From the dam it flows generally southwest, then southeast to Mount Hope Bay, passing to the east of the center of the town of Warren, Rhode Island and ending with Bristol, Rhode Island to the west and part of Warren, Rhode Island to the east. The river exits in a passage through the Bristol Narrows into Mount Hope Bay.

Crossings
Below is a list of crossings over the Kickamuit River. The list starts at the headwaters and goes downstream.
Swansea, Massachusetts
Locust Street
Reed Street
Interstate 195
Stephen French Road
Colletti Lane
Fall River Avenue (U.S. 6)
Burnside Drive
Lynnwood Road
Bushee Road
Warren, Rhode Island
Schoolhouse Road
Child Street (RI 103)

Tributaries
Heath Brook is the Kickamuit River's only named tributary, though it has many unnamed streams that also feed it.

Gallery

See also
List of rivers of Massachusetts
List of rivers of Rhode Island

References

Maps from the United States Geological Survey
Environmental Protection Agency
American Indian Place Names In Rhode Island

External links

Kickemuit River Council

Rivers of Bristol County, Massachusetts
Rivers of Bristol County, Rhode Island
Rivers of Massachusetts
Rivers of Rhode Island